Canine Companions for Independence is a US-based 501(c)(3) nonprofit organization that trains and provides assistance dogs. As of 2018, it has placed over 6,000 assistance dogs with recipients at no charge.

Foundations 

Canine Companions for Independence was founded in Santa Rosa, California, in July 1975 by Bonnie Bergin as the first program of its kind. While teaching in Asia, she had seen burros being used by disabled people and thought that dogs could serve a similar role in the US. Since then, it has grown into a national organization with six regional locations.

The organization pairs people with disabilities with highly trained assistance dogs and ongoing support at no cost to the recipient. All expenses pertaining to the breeding, raising, and training of the dogs are financed via private donations from corporations, individuals, and other foundations, as well as fundraising projects. It is estimated that each assistance dog and a lifetime of follow-up support for the dog costs $50,000. The Lions Club Project for Canine Companions for Independence (LPCCI), which was founded in 1983 as a significant provider of financial and volunteer support to Canine Companions, has donated a total of $3 million. In 2015, Canine Companions partnered with Henry Schein Animal Health, a provider of animal health products to veterinarians, which provides puppy raisers with free health care products.

A special program, "The Veterans Initiative", provides trained service dogs for disabled and injured veterans. The program received funding from a partnership between PetSmart and Canine Companions. In December 2014, the organization joined the United States Department of Veterans Affairs in a study to determine whether service dogs improve the quality of life for veterans with post-traumatic stress disorder.

In 2017, the organization worked with Chrysler brand on a new social online social initiative to raise awareness and support for the work done by Canine Companions.  The campaign, "Give a Dog a Job", let people follow along with the training of a particular puppy named Foley, and engage with him and his trainers on Facebook, Instagram and Twitter.

The dogs 
Canine Companions trains different types of dogs: service dogs (mobility assistance dogs, service dogs for veterans with post-traumatic stress disorder), skilled companions trained to work with an adult or child with a disability under the guidance of a facilitator, hearing dogs for the deaf and hard-of-hearing, and dogs for "facility teams". Facility teams consist of a dog and a human partner, who is usually a rehabilitation specialist, educator, or medical specialist. These dogs carry most of the skills of service dogs as well as specialized skills for however the services of the dog will be incorporated into facility programs and services.

Breeding and raising 
Canine Companions employs a breeding program to supply their dogs. They use Golden Retrievers and Labrador Retrievers or crosses of the two breeds.

Puppies are raised by volunteers who commit to keeping the dogs for 18 months, until it is time for them to enter the training program.

Training 
The four- to nine-month professional training begins when the dog is returned by the volunteer puppy raisers to one of Canine Companions' six regional centers across the US. The first three months of training reviews what the dogs have learned. Professional training includes in-depth health and temperament assessments, and each dog learns over 40 commands to increase independence including pulling a manual wheelchair, retrieving dropped items and opening doors. Dogs may be trained as hearing dogs that alert their deaf handler to sounds in the environment and lead the handler to the source of the sound. In 2018, Canine Companions began a pilot program training service dogs to assist veterans with post-traumatic stress disorder by providing a gentle buffer in crowds, turning on lights and interrupting nightmares and anxiety behaviors.

Individuals invited to be matched with a dog travel to the regional center that serves their state  for  a two-week class that teaches the recipients how to work with their new partners.  This includes learning about dog psychology, dog grooming and care as well as the commands that the dogs know.  Matching the dogs with the person is done carefully to make sure their activity levels and personalities match.  At the conclusion, the individuals go through testing and then participate in a graduation ceremony.

Canine Companions teams  return for routine follow-up over the course of the placement.  Canine Companions dog users may also periodically return for reunions or extra follow-up training at any time. Their usual term in service is eight to ten years.

References

External links 

Dog organizations
Assistance dogs